The Hundred Flowers Award for Best Picture was first awarded by the China Film Association in 1962.

Winners and nominees

2010s

2000s

1980-1990

1960s

References

Hundred Flowers, Best Picture
Actress
Awards for best film